Nilambur Balan was an Indian actor in Malayalam movies. He was one of the prominent supporting actor in late 1960s and 1970s in Malayalam movies. He has acted in more than 50 movies.

Biography
He was born at Vatakara. He was a theater artist before becoming a cine artist. Balan acted in many films, including the Sankupushpam. He was married to Vjayalakshmi on 8 December 1957. They have started a drama troupe, Kalithara, and acted together in many dramas. His wife is Kerala State Theater Award winning actress. The couple has three children Santhosh, Vijayakumar, Asha. He died on 4 February 1990.
An award instituted in memory of actor Nilambur Balan by the Nilambur Balan Anusmarana Samithi, to the personalities, for their contribution to the theater-cinema field.

Partial filmography

As an actor

 Moonnilonnu (1996) .... Nambiar
 Alicinte Anveshanam (1989)
 Padippura (1989)
 Ore Thoovalppakshikal (1988)
 Kanakambarangal (1988)
 Dhwani (1988)
 Janangalude Sredhakku (1987)
 Chanthayil Choodi Vilkkunna Pennu (1987)
 Amma Ariyaan (1986)
 Ilaneer (1981)
 Anyarude Bhoomi (1979)
 Bandhanam (1978)
Kaathirunna Nimisham (1978) .... Ashan
 Chuvanna Vithukal (1978)
 Vayanaadan Thampan (1978)
 Choondakkari (1977)
 Yatheem (1977)
 Sankhupushpam (1977)
 Mohavum Mukthiyum (1977)
 Mohiniyaattam (1976)
 Ajayanum Vijayanum (1976)
 Chottaanikkara Amma (1976)
 Criminals (Kayangal) (1975)
 Kalyaanappanthal (1975)
 Chandanachola (1975)
 Love Letter (1975)
 Chattambikkalyaani (1975)...James
 Nadeenadanmaare Aavasyamundu (1974)
 Swargaputhri (1973)
 Chuzhi (1973)
 Maram (1973)
 Aaraadhika (1973)
 Panimudakku (1972)
 Kuttyedathi (1971)
 Nizhalaattam (1970)
 Olavum Theeravum (1970)
 Asuravithu (1968)
 Pakalkkinaavu (1966)
 Murappennu (1965)

Direction
 Anyarude Bhoomi (1979)

Recipients of Nilumbur Balan Award
 2014 Santha Devi
 2013 Karanthoor
 2011 Kuttyedathi Vilasini
 2009 Mamukkoya
 2002 Nilambur Ayisha
 1998 K. T. Mohammed

References

External links

Nilambur Balan at MSI

Male actors in Malayalam cinema
Indian male film actors
Male actors from Kerala
Year of birth missing
1990 deaths
People from Malappuram district
20th-century Indian male actors
20th-century Indian film directors
Malayalam film directors
Film directors from Kerala